José David Toledo Bosquez (born 18 April 1982) is a Mexican former professional footballer who played as a midfielder. He has played in clubs such as Pumas UNAM, Altamira, Atlante, Tigres, Chiapas, Querétaro, Guadalajara, Puebla, and Oaxaca.

Club career

Pumas UNAM
Toledo started his professional career with Pumas UNAM in 2001. He made over 80 Primera Division appearances for Pumas.

Altamira
In 2005, Toledo was sent out on loan to Altamira. He only made two league appearances during his loan spell.

Atlante
In the 2007–08 Toledo played on loan at Atlante F.C. His first goal in the league for the club came on 1 September 2007 in a 2–2 draw with Santos Laguna. He scored the equalizing goal in the 79th minute, 12 minutes after teammate Giancarlo Maldonado had pulled one back for Atlante.

Tigres
In July 2009, Toledo was sold to Tigres UANL for an undisclosed fee. In 85 league appearances, spanning over four years, Toledo scored twice. His first goal came in a 2–2 draw on 30 January 2010 against Chiapas. He scored in the 51st minute, grabbing one back for Tigres.

Chiapas
Toledo left Tigres for Chiapas at the beginning of 2013. He was loaned back to the club after his transfer to Querétaro.

Queretaro
Querétaro purchased Toledo from Chiapas in 2013, but immediately loaned him back to his former club. He never appeared in the league during his tenure at Querétaro.

Guadalajara
Toledo plays for Guadalajara in the Primera Division de Mexico, following his transfer from Querétaro on 4 June 2014. Toledo made his league debut for his new club on 20 July 2014 in a 1–1 draw with Chiapas. He was subbed off after 60 minutes.

Puebla
In the summer of 2015, Toledo went out on loan to Puebla. In his two-year loan, he made 51 league appearances, scoring once. That lone goal came in a 3–0 win on 19 February 2017 against his former club Chiapas. It came from the penalty spot in the 62nd minute.

Oaxaca
In January 2018, Toledo moved to Alebrijes de Oaxaca in the Ascenso MX. He scored his first goal in the league in a 3–0 victory on 13 January 2018 against Correcaminos UAT. It came from the penalty spot in the 16th minute.

Honours
Atlante
 Primera División de México: Apertura 2007

UNAM
 Primera División de México: Clausura 2004, Apertura 2004, Clausura 2009

Tigres UANL
 Primera División de México: Apertura 2011

References

External links

Statistics by season at femexfut

1982 births
Living people
Footballers from Oaxaca
Club Universidad Nacional footballers
Atlante F.C. footballers
Tigres UANL footballers
Chiapas F.C. footballers
Querétaro F.C. footballers
C.D. Guadalajara footballers
Club Puebla players
Liga MX players
Association football midfielders
People from Juchitán de Zaragoza
Mexican footballers